Mesilla Valley Bosque State Park is a state park of New Mexico, United States, preserving a riverside forest (a bosque) along the Rio Grande. The park is located near Las Cruces and just west of Mesilla.

The park consists of river woodlands and restored wetlands. It is used by migratory birds, and is popular for birdwatching, walking, and bicycling. It is a day-use only park, and camping is not allowed.

An active Friends of Mesilla Valley Bosque State Park group exists to contribute to the park's restoration, recreation, and education missions.

References

External links 
 Mesilla Valley Bosque State Park
 Friends of Mesilla Valley Bosque State Park

State parks of New Mexico
Parks in Doña Ana County, New Mexico
Protected areas established in 2003
Rio Grande